Dennis Frank Wise (born 16 December 1966) is an English former professional football player and manager who played as a central midfielder. He is the president of Serie B side Como 1907. He is best known for having spent the majority of his career at Chelsea, from 1990 to 2001.

Beginning his career at Wimbledon, Wise came to prominence as a member of the "Crazy Gang", and in 1988, was part of the team that won the FA Cup in an upset victory over Liverpool. In 1990, he joined Chelsea, becoming captain three years later under the stewardship of Glenn Hoddle. During his time at Stamford Bridge, Wise won two FA Cups, a League Cup and a UEFA Cup Winners' Cup, and is the club's second most successful captain, behind John Terry. Wise was a popular figure amongst the Chelsea support, and was named the club's Player of the Year on two occasions. In June 2001, he was sold to Leicester City.

Internationally, Wise was in and out of the squad for the England national football team, with the majority of his appearances coming in 2000, when Kevin Keegan was manager. He was named in the UEFA Euro 2000 squad, playing in all three of England's group games. His only goal for the national side was on his debut on 1 May 1991, against Turkey.

In the latter years of his playing career, Wise gradually became involved in the managerial aspects of the game, starting at Millwall, where he took on the role of player-manager, taking them to the FA Cup Final and European football for the first time ever. He was briefly caretaker manager at Southampton, following the departure of Harry Redknapp, before he took over the reins at Swindon Town on a permanent basis. In October 2006, he was appointed manager of the then-Championship side Leeds United, who found themselves in the relegation zone. Although they were ultimately relegated, Wise reshaped his side in the close season and Leeds made an excellent start to their first season in the third tier of English football.

In a surprise career move, despite their strong position and likelihood of promotion, Wise left Leeds in January 2008 to join the newly reshaped management team at Newcastle United in an executive role, tasked with travelling around Europe and further afield identifying young players and developing the academy. Wise left Newcastle on 1 April 2009. Following the situation that led to his departure, Wise admitted that "it has all had a damaging effect on my career". He has since worked as a pundit for Sky Sports.

Playing career

Wimbledon
Wise started his career as an apprentice with Southampton, but was left without a club after he fell out with manager Lawrie McMenemy. He moved to Wimbledon on 28 March 1985 at the age of 18 on a free transfer and made his debut under manager Dave Bassett. During the autumn of 1985, Wise was loaned to Swedish non-league club Grebbestads IF. He returned to Plough Lane following his loan spell and helped the club gain promotion to the Football League First Division in 1986. In his first season in the First Division, Wise scored four goals in 27 starts as the club defied the critics and finished the season in sixth place.

He was a member of the infamous Wimbledon "Crazy Gang" that reached the 1988 FA Cup Final. On 12 March 1988, he provided the free-kick from which Brian Gayle headed in the clinching goal against Watford to secure passage to the semi-finals of the FA Cup. In Wimbledon's semi-final match against Luton Town on 9 April, he scored the winner as they reached the final with a 2–1 victory. In the final on 14 May, he played an influential role in defeating heavy favourites Liverpool at Wembley, containing winger John Barnes and supplying the cross from a free kick from which Lawrie Sanchez headed home the winning goal. Wimbledon were unable to compete in the 1988–89 European Cup Winners' Cup, due to the ongoing ban on English teams from European competitions, following the actions of a group of Liverpool supporters in the 1985 European Cup Final Heysel disaster.

Chelsea
Wise signed for Chelsea on 3 July 1990 for a then-club record fee of £1.6 million. In his first season with the club, he scored 13 goals in 44 matches as Chelsea finished in 11th place. Wise's former Wimbledon teammate Vinnie Jones joined Chelsea prior to the 1991–92 season, and the intimidating presence of his fellow Londoner in the middle of the park seemed to help him rediscover his best form. Wise was Chelsea's top scorer for the season with 14 goals from midfield, with perhaps his best performance coming in a 2–1 victory away to Liverpool on 1 February 1992; Chelsea's first league win at Anfield since 1935.

Following the departure of captain Andy Townsend in 1993, and the arrival of Glenn Hoddle as manager, Wise's growing stature within the side was recognised, with Hoddle installing him as captain. Though league form was disappointing throughout the 1993–94 season, with the Blues finishing 14th, Wise led Chelsea to their first FA Cup Final in 24 years, though he couldn't prevent the Blues crashing to a 4–0 defeat to Manchester United.

In the second league match of the 1994–95 season, Wise scored his first goal, netting a penalty as the Blues came from 0–2 down to defeat Leeds United 3–2 on 27 August 1994. Wise's ill-discipline began to show at the beginning of the 1994–95 season, picking up a red card for swearing in a 2–4 loss to Newcastle United on 10 September. He scored his first goal in Europe five days later, capping off an impressive Chelsea performance as the Blues defeated Viktoria Žižkov 4–2 in the first round of the Cup Winners' Cup. Worse was to follow off the pitch as Wise was sentenced to a three-month prison term in March 1995 for assaulting a London taxi-driver and was ordered to pay £965 compensation to him for damage to the cab, £169 for damage to his spectacles and £100 for the shock and distress. The prison sentence was later overturned on appeal. Nonetheless he was briefly stripped of the Chelsea captaincy by Hoddle over the affair, and a long term thigh injury capped a miserable season for the midfielder.

Wise captained the Chelsea team that defeated Middlesbrough 2–0 in the 1997 FA Cup Final, only the club's second FA Cup triumph and Wise's first trophy as Chelsea captain. Chelsea's success would continue in the 1997–98 season as Wise first led Chelsea to victory in the League Cup, another 2–0 win against Middlesbrough, the midfielder's cross for Frank Sinclair's opener capping a superb display. Wise also made a decisive contribution in the Cup Winners' Cup final, a dinked pass over the Stuttgart defence setting up Gianfranco Zola to score the winner, moments after coming on as a substitute.

Wise then captained Chelsea to victory over Real Madrid in the 1998 UEFA Super Cup, a late Gus Poyet strike securing a 1–0 victory in Monaco. His disciplinary issues were so severe during the 1998–99 season, that Wise missed no fewer than 15 matches in all competitions. He received three red cards in addition to being charged with biting the arm of Real Mallorca defender Elena Marcelino in the second half of their Cup Winners' Cup semi-final first-leg 1–1 draw at Stamford Bridge, though he was later cleared by UEFA. In the Premier League, he led Chelsea to their highest ever final position at the time, third, thereby securing a place in the Champions League for the first time in the club's history, losing only three leagues games along the way, a feat bettered by only three English champions in the 20th century.

In Chelsea's first ever Champions League match, a third-qualifying round match against Latvian side Skonto FC, Wise captained the side to a 3–0 victory, and 0–0 draw in the second leg meant that Chelsea had qualified for the group stage of the Champions League at the first time of asking. On 20 October 1999, he came on as a second-half substitute and scored Chelsea's fourth goal as they defeated Galatasaray 5–0 in Istanbul in their fourth Champions League group match. He scored a memorable Champions League equaliser in the San Siro against A.C. Milan a week later to secure top spot in the group. In February 2000 his disciplinary problems resurfaced as he was charged with misconduct by the FA following an alleged confrontation with Kenny Cunningham in the tunnel after the 3–1 victory over former club Wimbledon at Stamford Bridge, and was later fined £7,500. Wise captained Chelsea to their second FA Cup win in three years, being awarded the Man of the Match honour as the Blues defeated Aston Villa 1–0 courtesy of a Roberto Di Matteo goal on 20 May 2000. Wise's last major trophy as captain of Chelsea would come in the 2000 FA Charity Shield on 13 August, as goals from Jimmy Floyd Hasselbaink and Mario Melchiot secured a 2–0 win over reigning league champions Manchester United.

With new manager Claudio Ranieri seeking to lower the average age of the Chelsea squad, he was sold to Leicester City on 25 June 2001 for £1.6 million. His time at Stamford Bridge would span 11 years, from 1990 to 2001 and when he finally left Chelsea, the combative midfielder finished with the fourth most appearances in the club's history, featuring 445 times and scoring 76 goals.

Leicester City
Wise's time at Leicester was less successful and marred by controversy. He made just 17 league appearances, scoring once against Liverpool, and was sent home from a pre-season tour of Finland and suspended by the club on 20 July 2002 after breaking the nose and jaw of teammate Callum Davidson in an argument.

Wise was sacked by the club for serious misconduct on 2 August, after which Leicester went into administration. Surprised by the dismissal, he contacted the Professional Footballers' Association and appealed against the decision. The Football League Disciplinary Commission later ruled that Wise had been harshly treated by Leicester and ordered that he be reinstated and given the maximum punishment of two weeks' wages (about £70,000). The tribunal's order led the club to launch an appeal against the decision, which they won on 18 September.

Millwall
Wise then signed for Millwall on 24 September 2002 and became player-manager in 2003. Millwall were the first team from outside the top flight to reach the FA Cup final since Sunderland in 1992 when Wise led them to their first ever FA Cup Final in 2004. The First Division side lost to Manchester United 3–0. Despite losing, Millwall qualified for a place in the UEFA Cup for the first time in their history, as United had already qualified for the Champions League. They were knocked out in the first round by Hungarian champions Ferencváros. He resigned at the end of the 2004–05 season. Wise decided to leave as a new regime entered the club.

Southampton
Wise returned to Southampton on a free transfer on 27 June 2005 and made 12 appearances for the club. With the resignation of Harry Redknapp, he was briefly joint-caretaker manager of the club with Dave Bassett. However, he left St Mary's on 26 December, when George Burley was appointed as the new manager. He scored once in the league for Southampton, in a 2–2 draw with Ipswich Town.

Coventry City
It was not long before Wise was playing again, as he signed a six-month deal with Coventry City on 19 January 2006. He joined up once again with Micky Adams, who had been his manager whilst he was at Leicester. He made an emphatic start, beginning his spell with Coventry by scoring a goal in each of his first three games with the club, including a spectacular overhead kick from the edge of the penalty area against Hull City. On 9 May, out-of-contract Wise was offered a new one-year contract at the Ricoh Arena but decided it was time to hang up the boots and go back into management. He finished his Coventry career having scored six goals in thirteen appearances.

International career
Wise made his England debut on 1 May 1991 and scored the game's only goal as England defeated Turkey in a Euro 92 qualifying match at the İzmir Atatürk Stadium. Following a good season, Wise was expected to be included in the final squad for the 1996 European Championships held in England but just missed out on a place in Terry Venables' squad. Despite leading Chelsea to victories in the 1998 Football League Cup Final and the 1998 UEFA Cup Winners' Cup Final, Wise was passed over by former Chelsea manager Glenn Hoddle for a place in the England squad at the 1998 FIFA World Cup.

He earned a recall to the England team in 1999, after four years away from the national setup, playing in the match against Belgium. He followed this up with an impressive performance against Argentina on 23 February 2000, as the sides drew 0–0 at Wembley.

He featured in three of the four friendly matches for England in the build-up to the Euro 2000 tournament in the Netherlands and Belgium and was subsequently included in the final squad by manager Kevin Keegan. He came on as a second-half substitute for Steve McManaman in England's first match on 12 June 2000, his first competitive international in almost nine years, but England threw away a 2–0 lead and were defeated 2–3 by Portugal. He started England's next match against Germany and was praised for his part in the 1–0 win, England's first over Germany in a major tournament since the final of the 1966 World Cup. He started England's final group game against Romania as well, but was replaced by Nick Barmby at half-time as the Three Lions fell 2–3 to a late Ionel Ganea penalty kick and were eliminated.

Following Euro 2000, Wise played the full ninety minutes against winners France at the Stade de France in Paris on 2 September as the sides drew 1–1. His final cap for England came in a 0–0 World Cup qualifying match against Finland on 11 October 2000.

Managerial career

Swindon Town
On 22 May 2006, Wise was appointed Swindon Town player-manager on a three-year contract, with ex-Chelsea teammate Gustavo Poyet as his assistant. He made an excellent start to the season by winning six out of seven games and topping the League Two table with 18 points after a 2–0 away win against Chester City on 1 September. As a result of this tremendous start, Wise was awarded the Manager of the Month award.

On 24 October, Wise left Swindon to join Leeds United, leaving the club third in the league, with thirty-one points from fifteen games.

Leeds United
On 20 September 2006, Wise was linked with the vacant Leeds United managerial post, following the sacking of Kevin Blackwell. On 21 October, Swindon gave Wise, and his assistant Gus Poyet, permission to speak to Leeds, following their request. However, talks broke down between the clubs when they were unable to agree a suitable financial package and on 23 October, Swindon withdrew permission for Leeds to talk with, or seek to appoint, Wise and Poyet, stating that "Dennis and Gus remain valued members of Swindon Town FC as both players and part of the management team". In a bid to keep hold of the pair, the club offered them both significantly improved terms. Later that day, Swindon confirmed that they had reached a suitable financial settlement package with Leeds for the services of Dennis Wise and Gus Poyet and that they looked set to join. Following the successful negotiation of acceptable compensation in line with the expectations of Swindon Town, on 24 October, the boards of both clubs officially confirmed that Dennis Wise, Gus Poyet and Andrew Beasley had joined Leeds United as manager, assistant manager and goalkeeping coach respectively.

On the evening of his arrival, Wise watched from the stands at Elland Road as he saw his new side crash to a 3–1 defeat in the League Cup against fellow Championship side Southend United. He received a standing ovation from fans and in a press conference unveiling him to the media, he said that he believed that it did not matter that he formerly played for Chelsea. In the interview he stated that his aim was to bring Leeds back into the Premiership. Wise took over with the club second from bottom of the Championship and in a difficult financial position.

Wise's first game in charge came four days later, ironically against Southend at Elland Road again, though this time it was a league fixture and Leeds won the game 2–0. However, they continued to struggle for the remainder of the season under Wise and relegation was confirmed on 4 May 2007 with only one game remaining, when the Football League gave the club a 10-point penalty for going into administration. Leeds finished bottom of the league and they were relegated to League One for the first time in their history. Nonetheless, chairman Ken Bates retained Wise for the 2007–08 season.

On 4 August, Leeds were granted their golden share, but they were given another penalty, this time 15 points, after administrators KPMG refused to resurrect the CVA for the 'old' Leeds United company. Despite this, they made an excellent start, winning their first 7 league games and Wise was named as manager of the month for both August and September. However, on 29 October 2007, Poyet left Leeds to become Juande Ramos's assistant at Tottenham. Three days later, Wise's ex-manager at Wimbledon, Dave Bassett, became his number two. The partnership did not start well and Leeds finally lost their unbeaten record, losing 3–1 to Carlisle United at Brunton Park on 3 November.

Leeds briefly topped the table on Boxing Day, after drawing 1–1 in an early kick-off against Hartlepool United at the Victoria Ground and they went into 2008, third in the league. Wise left the club on 28 January 2008 in a surprise move to take up a role at Newcastle United, his last game in charge being a 1–1 draw against Luton Town at Kenilworth Road on 26 January.

Executive roles

Newcastle United 
On 29 January 2008, Newcastle United announced that Wise would be joining the club as Executive Director (Football), an advisor to the board on footballing matters, reporting directly to the club chairman Chris Mort. Although speculated to be in the role of Director of Football or General Manager, the job is thought to be more restricted, involving transfers, scouting and youth development, alongside simultaneous appointment of Tony Jimenez as Vice-President (Player Recruitment) and Jeff Vetere as Technical Co-ordinator, following the earlier shock return of first team manager Kevin Keegan. Keegan had previously expressed disquiet with the concept of a Director of Football, both in commenting about the previous Newcastle manager Sam Allardyce, and latterly the proposition of Newcastle owner Mike Ashley appointing one during his tenure at the club.

Wise's role, as stated by Ashley, was to be a '"football-related" executive director'. In a February 2008 interview, Mort revealed that Newcastle had "heard on the grapevine" that Wise was considering a "move upstairs". Wise was selected as his relative youth and being a "bundle of energy" suited the new role that would involve "travelling around Europe and further afield". Wise, with Vetere, was tasked with helping identify young players for approval by first team manager Kevin Keegan. Wise's role would also entail him helping develop the academy.

The departure of Keegan from the club, on 4 September, saw Wise, Jimenez (who left the club on 9 October) and club owner Ashley come under mounting pressure from the club's supporters to quit. Wise left Newcastle on 1 April 2009.

Como 1907 
On 9 May 2019, the Northern Italian team Como 1907 entrusted him with the role of technical consultant on behalf of SENT Entertainment, the consortium that had taken over the Larian company a few months earlier. In February 2021 he rose to the role of sole administrator, replacing Michael Gandler.

Bibliography
Wise published his autobiography, Dennis Wise: The Autobiography, in 1999.

Career statistics

Club

International
Score and result list England's goal tally first, score column indicates score after Wise goal.

Managerial statistics

Include all League, Cup & European first team fixtures.

Honours

Player
Wimbledon
FA Cup: 1987–88

Chelsea
FA Cup: 1996–97, 1999–2000
Football League Cup: 1997–98
FA Charity Shield: 2000
UEFA Cup Winners' Cup: 1997–98
UEFA Super Cup: 1998

Millwall
FA Cup runner-up: 2003–04 (as a player-manager)
Individual
Chelsea Player of the Season: 1997–98, 1999–2000
Alan Hardaker Trophy: 1998

Manager 
Individual
League One Manager of the Month: August 2007, September 2007
League Two Manager of the Month: August 2006

References

External links
 Chelsea Profile
 
 
  
 Full Managerial Stats for Leeds United from WAFLL

English footballers
England international footballers
England B international footballers
England under-21 international footballers
Southampton F.C. players
Wimbledon F.C. players
Chelsea F.C. players
Leicester City F.C. players
Millwall F.C. players
UEFA Euro 2000 players
English football managers
Millwall F.C. managers
Swindon Town F.C. managers
Leeds United F.C. managers
Coventry City F.C. players
Swindon Town F.C. players
Premier League players
1966 births
Living people
Footballers from Kensington
Newcastle United F.C. directors and chairmen
People educated at Phoenix High School, London
Association football midfielders
Southampton F.C. managers
Association football player-managers
Sportspeople convicted of crimes
English people convicted of assault
I'm a Celebrity...Get Me Out of Here! (British TV series) participants
FA Cup Final players
English autobiographers